Kelah Rash or Kelahrash, also known as Kalderesh, may refer to:
 Kelah Rash-e Bala
 Kelah Rash-e Pain